Meatless Farm is a British company that produces vegan, plant-based meats which are made primarily from pea protein. It was founded in 2016 by the Danish entrepreneur, Morten Toft Bech.

History
The company produces plant-based meats which are made primarily from pea protein. It was founded in 2016 by Morten Toft Bech, a Danish entrepreneur and former trader. As of October 2020, Meatless Farm employs 100 people in Leeds, Amsterdam, New York, and Singapore. 

The company started production in 2018, and initially sold its products in British supermarkets. In September 2019, Meatless Farm expanded to the United States through a partnership with American supermarket Whole Foods. In October its burger became the first plant-based burger to be added to the menu of British pub chain Wetherspoons. 

In September 2020, Meatless Farm secured £24m of funding. The company had previously raised £14m from investors including Channel 4.

See also
 List of meat substitutes

References

Meat substitutes
Vegan brands
Food and drink companies of England
Manufacturing companies based in Leeds
British companies established in 2016